Embee is a Swedish hip hop DJ and producer. He was born Magnus Bergkvist on February 24, 1977 in Badelunda, Västmanland, Sweden. He is best known for his work with Swedish hip-hop group Looptroop Rockers. His first solo album Tellings from Solitaria won a Swedish Grammy Award for best hip hop or soul release of 2005.

Collaborations include Capleton, Dilated Peoples, Saïan Supa Crew, José González, Seinabo Sey, Sabina Ddumba, Jojje Wadenius to name a few.

Recording history

He was born and spent his childhood in Västerås Sweden. At the age of 19, he moved to Gothenburg. He formed Looptroop in the early 1990s with Cosmic and Promoe two MCs who he had met in school. He started working with Promoe in 1991 and Cosmic joined them in 1993 to form Looptroop. Their first demo tape Superstars was released in 1993.

Embee worked in the US as a solo DJ for a year in the mid-1990s and released a number of solo singles and EPs during that time. He returned to Sweden in 1996 for the release of the second Looptroop tape Threesticksteez which featured a couple of tracks from Supreme. Supreme became a fully fledged member of the group for the From the Waxcabinet tape in 1996 (later released as a vinyl EP) named after the groups's recording studio "The Wax Cabinet".

Embee founded the David vs Goliath record company together with the other members of Looptroop 1998. Their first album on that label was Modern Day City Symphony released in 2000 both in Sweden and internationally followed by The Struggle Continues in 2002, Fort Europa in April 2005 and Good Things in 2008. Embee won successive awards at the Swedish hip hop awards as best producer for the first two albums. Embee toured throughout the world with Looptroop to promote Modern Day City Symphony including Europe, Canada, Japan, Australia and South Africa and continued to do international tours for all the following albums as well.

Embee is a member of the Casual Brothers. Embee produces the beats and Cosmic (a former member of Looptroop) raps over them. So far, they have released two EPs together (The Casual Brothers and Custumer's Choice (Part Two)), which featured Christian Kjellvander.

In 2004, Embee released the first solo album Tellings from Solitaria which featured an appearance from the other members of Looptroop and other Swedish artists such as José González, Daniel Lemma, Vanessa Liftig and Timbuktu (artist) . Recorded over a couple of years and mixed by Embee &  Soundism, it was critically acclaimed and won a Swedish Grammy Award as the best hip hop/soul release in 2005. He also won the Swedish DJ awards in 2004 and 2006.

In early 2010 Embee released The Mellow Turning Moment on Bad Taste Records. Some guests include Maia Hirasawa, Nikola Sarcevic of Millencollin, Hello Saferide, Mariam Wallentin of Wildbirds & Peacedrums, Fabian Kallerdahl and Erik Undéhn from The Early Days.

In November 2010 Embee released Skuggpoeten through his Wax Cabinet Productions/David vs Goliath label. The album is a collaboration with folk singer/componist Esmeralda Moberg and Embee's father, writer Roger Bergkvist.

During 2012 and 2013 Embee wrote the symphony Fair Ground together with Promoe, Cleo, Seinabo Sey and Ayla Adams. It was played at The Opera House Norrlandsoperan in Umeå with a full symphonic orchestra, conducted by Josef Rhedin, in October 2013.

On October 11, 2013, Embee released the four track EP Machine Park Jogger.

Embee was inducted into the Swedish Music Hall of Fame on March 23, 2017.

Discography
Embee
 Machine Park Jogger (EP, 2013)
 The Mellow Turning Moment (album, 2010)
 Upside Down (single, 2010)
 A Day at a Time (single, 2009)
 Dom Trevande Åren (2009)
 Retty (2009)
 Barney Bilen (2007)
 Mash Hits (2006)
 Tellings From Solitaria (album, 2004)
 Send Someone Away feat. José González (Single, 2005)
 Not Tonite (Single, 2004)
 Embeetious Art EP (2000)
 The Way Beyond Mixtape 1998 (1998)
 Way Beyond Mixtape (1995)
Embee & Ayla
 The Air (2017)
 Sweet (2017)
 Easy Love (2017)
Fair Ground (Symphony, 2013)
 Gåshud
 Smaka Luft
 Alla Har Drömmar
 Brev Från Framtiden
 De Ofödda Barnen
 Haru Pass
 Falafel
 Hopp

Skuggpoeten
 Skuggpoeten (album, 2010)
 En kväll i maj (single, 2010)
 I de gula träden (single edit) (2010)

Looptroop Rockers
 Mitt hjärta är en bomb (album, 2013)
 Aldrig (Single, 2013)
 Hårt mot hårt (Single, 2013)
 Trick Ill Down Economics (2012)
 Fuel (2012)
 Professional Dreamers (album, 2011)
 On Repeat (2010)
 Radiation (2009)
 Frigör musiken (2009)
 The Hits (2008)
 The Rarities (2008)
 Praying on a Liver (2008)
 Good Things (album, 2008)
 The Building (2008)
 Fort Europa (album, 2005)
 Don't Hate the Player (2003)
 The Struggle Continues (album, 2002)
 Fly Away (2002)
 Looptroopland (2002)
 Modern Day City Symphony (album, 2000)
 Long Arm of the Law (2000)
 Ambush in the Night (1999)
 Schlook From Birth (EP, 1999)
 Punx Not Dead (album, 1999)
 Heads or Tails (EP, 1998)
 From the Wax Cabinet (Album, 1998)
 From Beyond K-Line (EP, 1998)
 Unsigned Hype (EP, 1997)
 From the Wax Cabinet (Tape, 1996)
 Three Sick Steez (Tape, 1995)
 Superstars (Tape, 1993)

Per Vers
 Find mig her (single, 2013)
 Ego (album, 2011)
 Smuk kamp feat. Zap Mama (2011)
 Ironman (2011)
 Hav det godt (2011)
 Jag tjener kassen (2011)
 Ironman (2011)
 Nej tak (2011)
 Just Do it (2011)
 Kære lytter (2011)

Mofeta & Jerre
 Är Vi Där Nu? (2010)

 Mary's Mine 
 Can You Hear Me (2012)
 Spinning Around (2012)
 Giving You Back (2012)

Antennasia
 Metronome Wiper (Embee Remix) (2012)
 Velo-City (2008)
 Yojigen Kosa Shingo Ikeru

Queen's English
 Full Limit (2009)

Timbuktu
 Olympiska Spelen 2012 (2008)

Nomak feat. TOR
 Time of Reflect (2008)

Ninsun Poli
 Stay or Go (2008)
 Drifting (2008)
 Miss Behave (2008)

Promoe
 White Man's Burden (2006)
 Songs of Joy (Feat. Capleton)
 In the Morning (Feat. Daville)
 Eurotrash (Feat. Leeroy of Saïan Supa Crew)
 Songs of Joy (2006)
 The Long Distance Runner (2004)
 Marathon
 Long Distance Runner
 Constant Consumption
 Calm Down
 Long Distance Runner (2004)
 Government Music (2001)
 Dawn
 Big in Japan
 Prime Time
 Freedom Fighters
 Freedom Writers
 THX 1138
 Injected
 Conspiracy
 Positive & Negative
 Prime Time (2001)

The Casual Brothers
 Custumer's Choice (2003)
 The Casual Brothers (2001)

Sedlighetsroteln
 Släpp Fångarna Loss (2003)
 Hallå!
 Sedlighetsroteln (2001)
 Ring Snuten
 Looptroop Va' Här

PST/Q
 Natt Klockan Tolv På Dagen (2002)
 En Dåres Försvarstal (feat. Martin Westerstrand)
 Jag Ser
 Så Lät Det Då (feat. Supreme)
 Vi mot röset (feat. Supreme)
 Fan Snackar Du Om
 Jorå Saat E
 Storfräsare (feat. Timbuktu & Profilen)
 Egotripp
 Vi Mot Röset (2002)
 Pluralis Majestatis (1999)
 Jesuskomplex
 Tid Att Göra Upp Räkningen
 Håll Käften

Jol
 Life in the Sun (2006)

Mobbade Barn Med Automatvapen
 Nu Ännu Drygare (2003)
 Småsaker
 Nu ännu Drygare

Petter
 Reflexion (2007)
 Storstadsidyll (2006)

Ison & Fille
 Klippta Vingar (2004)

Chilly & Leafy
 Vilka är dom (2003)
 Vilka är dom (2002)

Soundtrack
 I Taket Lyser Stjärnorna (2009)
 Friendly Fire (2006)
 Quality Control (2004)
 Festival (2001)
 Jalla, Jalla (2000)

See also
 Looptroop Rockers

References

External links
 EMI Publishing page about Embee
 Soundism page about Embee
 Naked Swedes album credits
 [ Allmusic.com. Embee discography]
   Embee biography (cached version)
 

Hip hop record producers
Swedish hip hop DJs
Swedish hip hop musicians
People from Västerås
1977 births
Living people